Stanisław Knapowski (May 19, 1931 – September 28, 1967) was a Polish mathematician who worked on prime numbers and number theory. Knapowski published 53 papers despite dying at only 36 years old.

Life and education

Stanisław Knapowski was the son of Zofia Krysiewicz and Roch Knapowski. His father, Roch Knapowski was a lawyer in Poznań but later taught at Poznań University. The family moved to the Kielce province in south-eastern Poland after the German invasion of 1939 but returned to Poznań after the war.

Stanisław completed his high school education in 1949 excelling at math and continued on at Poznań University to study mathematics. Later in 1952 he continued his studies at University of Wrocław and earned his master's degree in 1954.

Knapowski was appointment an assistant at Adam Mickiewicz University in Poznań under Władysław Orlicz and worked towards his doctorate. He studied under the direction of Pál Turán starting in Lublin in 1956. He published many of his papers with Turán and Turán wrote a short biography of his life and work in 1971 after his death.
Knapowski began to work in this area and finished his doctorate in 1957 “Zastosowanie metod Turaná w analitycznej teorii liczb” ("Certain applications of Turan's methods in the analytical theory of numbers").

Knapowski had the opportunity to work abroad. He spent a year in Cambridge and worked with Louis J. Mordell and listened to classes by J.W.S. Cassels and Albert Ingham. He then moved on to Belgium, France and The Netherlands.

Knapowski returned to Poznań to finish another thesis to complete a post-doctoral qualification needed to lecture at a German university. "On new "explicit formulas" in prime number theory" in 1960.
In 1962 the Polish Mathematical Society awarded him their Mazurkiewicz Prize and he moved to Tulane University in New Orleans, United States. After a very short return to Poland, he left again and taught in Marburg in Germany, Gainesville, Florida and Miami, Florida.

Death
Knapowski was a good classical pianist. He was also an avid driver, but he died in a traffic accident where he lost control of his car, leaving the Miami airport.

Work

Knapowski expanded on the work of others in several fields of number theory, prime number theorem, modular arithmetic and non-Euclidean geometry.

Number of times the Δ(n) prime sign changes

Mathematicians work on primality tests to develop easier ways to find prime numbers when finding them by trial division is not practical. This has many applications in cybersecurity. There is no formula to calculate prime numbers. However, the distribution of primes can be statistically modelled. The prime number theorem, which was proven at the end of the 19th century, says that the probability of a randomly chosen number being prime is inversely proportional to its number of digits (logarithm).

 

And 

Bernhard Riemann stated that   was always negative but J.E. Littlewood later disproved this.
In 1914 J.E. Littlewood proved that there are arbitrarily large values of x for which

 

and that there are also arbitrarily large values of x for which

Thus the difference (x) − Li(x) changes sign infinitely many times.

Stanley Skewes then added an upper bound on the smallest natural number :

 

Knapowski followed this up and published a paper on the number of times  changes sign in the interval .

Modular arithmetic

Knapowski worked in other areas of number theory. One area was on the distribution of prime numbers in different residue classes modulo  .

Modular arithmetic modifies usual arithmetic by only using the numbers , for a natural number  called the modulus.

The distribution of the primes looks random, without a pattern. Take a list of consecutive prime numbers and divide them by another prime (like 7) and keep only the remainder (this is called reducing them modulo 7). The result is a sequence of integers from 1 to 6. Knapowski worked to determine the parameters of this modular distribution

Other areas of research
Non-Euclidean geometry
On prime numbers in arithmetical progression
Möbius function
On a theorem of Hecke
On Linnik's theorem concerning exceptional L-zeros” (1961) 
Comparative prime number theory
 On Siegel's Theorem

References

1931 births
1967 deaths
20th-century Polish mathematicians
People from Poznań